The North Michigan Street-North Superior Street Historic District is located in De Pere, Wisconsin.

History
The residential neighborhood in the district is one of the oldest in Wisconsin. Some houses in it date back to the 1860s. The district was added to the State Register of Historic Places in 2006 and to the National Register of Historic Places in 2007.

References

Historic districts on the National Register of Historic Places in Wisconsin
National Register of Historic Places in Brown County, Wisconsin